The Bechdel Cast is a weekly podcast about the representation of women in film. It is named after the Bechdel test. The Bechdel Cast is hosted by Los Angeles–based comedians Caitlin Durante and Jamie Loftus.

In November 2016 The Bechdel Cast released their introductory episode titled "Welcome to The Bechdel Cast!" Their first episode was on the film Kill Bill with guest Zach Sherwin.

The show is broadcast on the iHeartRadio Network (after HowStuffWorks Network, under Stuff Media, was bought by iHeartMedia). Episodes are available on iTunes, Stitcher Radio, SoundCloud, and Spotify. Select episodes are released to supporters on the crowdfunding platform Patreon twice a month.

Premise 
The name of the podcast derives from cartoonist Alison Bechdel, who developed the concept of the Bechdel test, sometimes called the Bechdel–Wallace test. The test investigates whether or not a work includes at least two women conversing about a topic other than a man. Sometimes a requirement that the two women must have names is added, which is a rule the podcast adheres to. For the purposes of the show, the exchange only needs to be two lines of dialogue. A commonality of many movies that pass is that often only this minimum is reached typically by an inconsequential conversation or one in which the two lines are nested within a larger conversation that is about men.

The hosts often discuss the limitations of the Bechdel Test and, despite using it as their namesake, primarily employ it to initiate a larger discussion about the depiction and uses of female-identifying characters in film. The hosts have recently moved to a use of the test that looks at whether a film has two named characters of any marginalized gender, who have a conversation about anything other than a man, for two lines of dialogue, and increasingly lines must be relevant or central to the plot.

They occasionally reference and utilize similar tests of representation, such as the Vito Russo test, the DuVernay Test, and the Mako Mori Test.

Format and structure 
The podcast is informally comedic, and formatted in an improvisational style. They frequently mention supplemental running jokes, such as Loftus' obsession with actor Alfred Molina, and Durante's reminder of her Master's Degree in Screenwriting from Boston University.

The hosts begin by introducing their guest, often a comedian, actor, or other media personality. Durante then briefly recaps the film at the top of the episode with interjections from Loftus and the guest. This is followed by analyzing and discussing the representation of women through an intersectional lens, alternating in tone between serious and jocular.

At the end of each episode, they determine whether or not the film passes the Bechdel test, as well as rate it on a "nipple scale" from 0 to 5 nipples based on how female-identifying characters are portrayed overall.

Episodes typically range from 45 minutes to 80 minutes, and are released once a week on Thursdays and additional episodes a month on Patreon. Most episodes are recorded in the HowStuffWorks studio in Los Angeles. Within the past year they have begun touring and performing for studio audiences as The Bechdel Cast, which include live episodes such as "The Notebook with Caitlin Gill" and "Edward Scissorhands with Maggie Mae Fish".

Hosts 
Caitlin Durante is a comedian and producer. She was the program producer for the Nerdmelt Showroom comedy venue at Meltdown Comics in Los Angeles from early 2015 until it closed in April 2018. She is also a scriptwriter and story analyst, and frequently offers writing workshops in Los Angeles and Boston.

Jamie Loftus is a sketch writer, animator, and actor. Her comedic style can best be described as alternative comedy, with absurd pieces such as her one-woman show "I Lost My Virginity August 15, 2010" and her attempt to raise money for Planned Parenthood by selling Shrek nudes. She has also written and starred in video content for media sites Adult Swim, Comedy Central, Paste, and Super Deluxe.

Criticism and Reception 
Early reviews of the show characterized it as a "roast of your favourite movie".

The tone of the podcast has evolved over the years as the hosts have become more educated on Intersectional feminist issues and episodes have taken on more serious films about or by marginalized people, with earlier episodes having been more flippant in their comedic style. Due to the evolution of the show, some reviewers have suggested new listeners try out the podcast by starting with later episodes such as the one covering Black Panther.

The podcast has appeared on multiple lists for top podcasts in the realm of feminist film review.

Episodes

Notes 
1.Only Loftus gave a rating in this episode.
2.Loftus would later admit that she has never seen The Matrix. On the Dec. 22, 2021 Loftus reminded the audience she had not watched on their initial recording but did watch for the Dec 22nd new episode.
3.The cumulative total is higher due to the participation of two guests. A film's weighted score, created by averaging the total guest scores, is indicated with (W); the cumulative with (C).
4.The guest left the episode early and did not give a rating.
5.In the absence of three ratings a weighted score is created by averaging the two available scores to create a proxy guest score.
6.Durante gave the film -40 Nipples and -40 Ass-Cheeks.
7.Loftus gave the film -40 Nipples and -40 Butts.
8.The guest did not give a rating.
9.Loftus asked the Wikipedia editor updating the page to choose between 3.5 or 4. This editor has chosen 4.
10.The guest opted to not use the Nipple Rating and gave the film "1 me at [age] 18."
11.Given the specific content of this film, Caitlin and Jamie said that while it may have passed they were not choosing to address the test and whether it passed.
12.Caitlin initially rated it .5 nipples but to keep the total low given Grace's 4.5 nipples, she lowered hers to -4.
13.First of several re-dos of early episodes, since taken down from the feed.
14.Bridget said she could not give it a 4 but was in a 3.5-4 range so I selected 3.75 for score total.
15.Caitlin did not decide on a score so in calculating the total this editor used an average score in calculating the totals.
16.The guest, Cerise Castle, did not give a score but said it was horrible which this editor interpreted as a zero.
17.Per Jaime's request scores were 6 nipples as a little joke, note the date of release. 
18.Over the last few episodes their definition and use of the Bechdel Test has expanded to not just be a two passing lines but lines central to the plot. This movie has lines that pass on the surface but are not relevant to the story. 
19.They speak about To All the Boys I've Loved Before but discuss the whole trilogy in this episode. 
20.At the time of recording Jaime did not feel like she was able to give a rating to the film as she is still processing given the subject matter.
21.Keah Brown was a brief guest and did not remain for the whole Matreon episode and so was not around to provide a rating when the episode was moved to the main feed. 
22.This episode and episode 252 are an Aack Cast crossover. Episode 251, Caitlin and Jamie introduce the episode. Episode 252, is a reshare of the Aackcast Episode 3.
23.After initially giving the film a 3.25 Caitlin, given the content of the movie, changed her rating to pi, 3.14...giving the total rating a never-ending decimal point.
24.Caitlin oscillated between and 0 and .5 and seemed like she was leaning toward 0 and this editor chose 0 as the nipple scale rating.
25.This episode, covering Mad Max:Fury Road, is a re-do of an initial episode where Caitlin and Jamie discuss their growth from their initial recording.
26.Miles Gray gave the film 24 Nipto coins that converts to 5 nipples. They proceeded to joke about Nipto currency.
27.Caitlin could not decide between 2 and 3 and was leaning toward 2.5 which this editor chose as her official score.
28.Mala assigned 4 nipples to start but while assigning them, in wanting to give more, gave 5 so this editor chose 5 as her score.
29.Cerise's audio was lost and Caitlin said that her rating was between 0 and 1 and this editor chose 0 for the score.
30.The Santa Clauses is the only TV show covered by the Bechdel Cast. The vibe of this episode is very comedic resulting in a 10 nipple rating from everyone, a largely unprecedented ranking.
31.Jamie was thinking of giving a 2.5 but also wanted to give an extra .5 so said the editor should choose and this editor chose 2.75, between 2.5 and 3.
32.This is part one of a two part Titanic episode, labeled tape one as a nod to the movie released on 2 VHS tapes. There is no guest. In this episode they do not recap the episode (so no Bechdel Test pass or ratings) but they discuss their history with Titanic and briefly recap their previous episodes.
33.This is part two of a two part Titanic episode. Again, there is no guest. In this episode they recap the movie and provide new factoids, context and information from various commentary tracks. They do not address the Bechdel Test, or provide a rating of the film.
34.This episode featured a live segment with Dani Fernandez who gave the film 8 nipples. Caitlin and Jamie gave their rating after having guest La'Ron Readus discuss the film more in depth. Neither he nor the hosts gave ratings, but Caitlin and Jamie gave their rating after in the final segment. 
34.This episode revisits Titanic again with a discussion of the animated The Legend of the Titanic, Titanic II, documentary the Six and more. 
35.This Matreon episode is titled "The (Little) Snow(wo)man" as the Little Women movie received the most votes and they spend the first 10 minutes discussing Little Women and said they didn't have anything new to say and thus chose to discuss the Snowman, and spend the rest of the episode it.
36.{Intended to be a main-feed episode about the 2017 movie The Shape of Water, Caitlin and Jamie get distracted talking about the band 311's cruise, how Jamie would like to die (as the only fatality on the 311 cruise), the Avatar movie franchise, the staff of Medieval Times unionizing, and various other cultural ephemera and never get around to talking about the movie.
37.Caitlin and Jamie discuss Pinocchio broadly as part of their Pinocchio Wars Matreon theme (including the source material), Pinocchio: A True Story (with Pauly Shore) and the Disney live-action remake.
38.Caitlin and Jamie continue the Pinocchio Wars with a discussion of Guillermo Del Toro's Pinocchio and briefly The Erotic Adventures of Pinocchio.

References

External links 

 
 Caitlin Durante
 Jamie Loftus

Feminist podcasts
Film review websites
American film review websites